Drew Eubanks (born February 1, 1997) is an American professional basketball player for the Portland Trail Blazers of the National Basketball Association (NBA). He played college basketball for the Oregon State Beavers.

Early life 
Eubanks was born in Starkville, Mississippi, and lived in Louisville, Mississippi, before moving to Troutdale, Oregon, at age 2.

College career
Eubanks played for the Oregon State Beavers of the Pac-12 Conference. He was rated a 4-star recruit who was rated No. 1 in the state of Oregon and committed to the Beavers over Cal, Gonzaga, Oregon, and others.

Eubanks averaged 14.5 points, 8.3 rebounds and 2.2 blocks per game as a sophomore on a team that won five games. As a junior, Eubanks averaged 13.2 points, 6.8 rebounds and 1.7 blocks per game. He declared for the 2018 NBA draft after the season, forgoing his final season of collegiate eligibility.

Professional career

San Antonio Spurs (2018–2022)
After going undrafted in the 2018 NBA draft, Eubanks signed with the San Antonio Spurs for NBA Summer League play. On September 17, 2018, Eubanks signed a two-way deal with the San Antonio Spurs. Eubanks made his NBA debut on October 20, 2018, in a 108–121 loss against the Portland Trail Blazers, playing three and a half minutes and scoring two points.

On November 24, 2020, Eubanks re-signed with the Spurs.

On 10 February 2022, Eubanks, Thaddeus Young, and a 2022 second-round selection were traded to the Toronto Raptors in exchange for Goran Dragić and a 2022 first-round draft selection. He was subsequently waived.

Portland Trail Blazers (2022–present) 
On February 22, 2022, Eubanks signed a 10-day contract with the Portland Trail Blazers. He signed a second 10-day contract on March 4, a third 10-day contract on March 14 and a fourth on March 24. On April 3, he signed a contract for the rest of the season.

On July 7, 2022, the Trail Blazers re-signed Eubanks to a 1-year contract.

Personal life
Eubanks married his wife Hailey on August 20, 2022.

Career statistics

NBA

Regular season

|-
| style="text-align:left;"|
| style="text-align:left;"|San Antonio
| 23 || 0 || 4.9 || .577 ||  || .846 || 1.5 || .3 || .1 || .2 || 1.8
|-
| style="text-align:left;"|
| style="text-align:left;"|San Antonio
| 22 || 3 || 12.4 || .642 || 1.000 || .769 || 3.9 || .7 || .2 || .8 || 4.9
|-
| style="text-align:left;"|
| style="text-align:left;"|San Antonio
| 54 || 3 || 14.0 || .566 || 1.000 || .726 || 4.5 || .8 || .3 || .9 || 5.8
|-
| style="text-align:left;"|
| style="text-align:left;"|San Antonio
| 49 || 9 || 12.1 || .528 || .125 || .747 || 4.0 || 1.0 || .3 || .6 || 4.7
|-
| style="text-align:left;"|
| style="text-align:left;"|Portland
| 22 || 22 || 29.5 || .646 || .267 || .784 || 8.5 || 1.6 || .8 || .5 || 14.5
|- class="sortbottom"
| style="text-align:center;" colspan="2" |Career
| 170 || 37 || 14.0 || .590 || .308 || .753 || 4.4 || .9 || .3 || .7 || 5.9

References

External links
Oregon State Beavers bio

1997 births
Living people
American men's basketball players
Austin Spurs players
Basketball players from Mississippi
Basketball players from Oregon
Oregon State Beavers men's basketball players
People from Troutdale, Oregon
Portland Trail Blazers players
Power forwards (basketball)
San Antonio Spurs players
Sportspeople from the Portland metropolitan area
Sportspeople from Starkville, Mississippi
Undrafted National Basketball Association players